

Apocrypta is an Old World genus of parasitic fig wasps in the family Pteromalidae. They are parasitoids of gall-wasps in the Sycophagini tribe, and especially Ceratosolen species, pollinators of the Sycomorus, Sycocarpus and Neomorphe sections of Ficus. They seem to be fig species-specific.

Biology
They parasitize certain species of the fig wasp genera Apocryptophagus and Ceratosolen. The long ovipositor is pierced through the fig wall to infect the fig wasp larvae during their development inside the flower galls. Penetration of the syconium wall may last from 6 to 55 minutes, depending on the wasp and fig species.

Ceratosolen wasps are key pollinator species, and their production is consequently reduced. Apocryptophagus wasps are however gall forming non-pollinators. Some differences in Apocrypta behaviour and morphology reflect the variety in fig inflorescence morphology.

Morphology
The adult female has an elongate external ovipositor, some 2 to 5 mm long, which reflects the thickness of the syconium wall of the host fig species. To stabilize the long ovipositor during oviposition, the proximal gastral segments can telescope outwards as the abdomen is lifted up, which in some species leans forward beyond the head. The ovipositor is enclosed and guided by a flexible ovipositor sheath. As in several genera of parasitic wasp, the highly flexible sheath supports the ovipositor's tip during the initial stages of oviposition. In some species, such as Apocrypta westwoodi, the ovipositor has zinc-hardened drill bits.

Species
There are some 27 described species which include:
Apocrypta acaeta Ulenberg, 1985
Apocrypta bakeri (Joseph, 1952) – host fig F. hispida, host C. solmsi Mayr
Apocrypta brachycephala Grandi, 1916
Apocrypta caudata (Girault, 1915)

Apocrypta guineensis Grandi, 1916 – host fig F. sur, host C. capensis, etc.

Apocrypta perplexa Coquerel, 1855 – host fig F. mauritiana
Apocrypta polyspina Ulenberg, 1985
Apocrypta regalis Grandi, 1916
Apocrypta robusta Grandi, 1916 – host fig F. vallis-choudae
Apocrypta setoptera Ulenberg, 1855
Apocrypta suprasegmenta Ulenberg, 1985
Apocrypta tanyceraea Ulenberg, 1985
Apocrypta varicolor (Mayr, 1885)
Apocrypta westwoodi Grandi, 1916 – host fig F. racemosa, host C. fusciceps 
Apocrypta sp.  – host fig F. semicordata, host C. gravelyi Grandi

Gallery

References

External links 

Pteromalidae
Hymenoptera genera
Taxa named by Charles Coquerel